Happy Reunion is an album by American pianist, composer and bandleader Duke Ellington recorded in 1956 and 1958 but not released on the Doctor Jazz label until 1985. The album features two small group sessions led by Ellington and recorded in Chicago.

Reception

The Allmusic review by Scott Yanow stated: "A particular highlight is hearing Gonsalves  play 31 choruses on "Diminuendo and Crescendo in Blue" in this setting".

Track listing
All compositions by Duke Ellington except where noted
 "Way Back Blues" (Count Basie) - 3:25
 "Where's the Music?" - 3:11 	 
 "Rubber Bottom" - 2:48
 "Play the Blues and Go" - 4:32
 "In a Mellow Tone" [Take 1] (Ellington, Milt Gabler) - 3:14
 "In a Mellow Tone" [Take 2] (Ellington, Gabler) - 2:58
 "Happy Reunion" [Take 1] - 3:26
 "Happy Reunion" [Take 2] - 2:42
 "Diminuendo and Crescendo in Blue (The Wailing Interval)" - 7:20
Recorded at Universal Studios, Chicago on March 19, 1956 (tracks 1-4) and June 24, 1958 (tracks 5-9).

Personnel
Duke Ellington – piano
Clark Terry - trumpet (tracks 1-4)
John Sanders - valve trombone (tracks 1-4)
Jimmy Hamilton - clarinet (tracks 1-4) 
Johnny Hodges - alto saxophone (tracks 1-4)
Paul Gonsalves - tenor saxophone (tracks 5-9)
Jimmy Woode - bass 
Sam Woodyard - drums

References

Sony Records albums
Duke Ellington albums
1985 albums
Doctor Jazz Records albums